Johnston Street Bridge is a concrete road bridge crossing the Yarra River between the Melbourne suburbs of Abbotsford and Kew.

The current bridge was constructed in 1954-6 by the Victorian Country Roads Board (CRB) using a design employing cast-in-place reinforced-concrete curved T girders and an integral flat slab deck. The bridge was designed by Bruce A. Watson of the Country Roads Board. Watson went on to become later to become the CRB Chief Bridge Engineer.

The early 1837 survey for the Melbourne township established a preferred route to the east of the Yarra River along Johnston Street, which was confirmed in La Trobe's 1841 plan of proposed roads to outlying districts. This became one of the earliest road construction projects, with gangs of unemployed immigrants undertaking roadworks in 1842. Johnston Street was named after a Melbourne City Councillor in 1851 and a toll gate was installed soon after. The river could be forded nearby at Dight's Falls, but advocates for a bridge over the Yarra in 1855 debated over a preferred crossing at this site or near the end of Clarke Street or near the current Collins Footbridge. Another privately owned "Penny Bridge" was provided nearby at the end of Church Street in 1857.

The bridge is also known as the Studley Park Road bridge, with the first bridge having been built as a laminated timber arch with timber lattice truss spandrels in 1858 and was replaced with riveted wrought iron girders in 1876.

A section of the original riveted wrought iron lattice handrail survives as a fence across the surviving eastern bluestone abutment. The 1876 structure was built by W. A. Shand, father-in-law of prominent ironworker and engineer, Mephan Ferguson. The wrought iron spans were about 18 metres on the same alignment, adapting the original abutments. This was one of the first local bridges to employ cylindrical iron columns, which were filled with concrete to provide slender piers to reduce any impediment floodwaters.

It is located on State Route 34.

The Abbotsford end of the bridge was the terminus of the Collingwood cable tramway line, with a car shed located nearby. The car shed has now been demolished. The line closed in 1939, and nowadays bus routes 200 and 207 use the bridge.

References

Road bridges in Victoria (Australia)
Concrete bridges in Australia
Bridges in Melbourne
Bridges completed in 1956
Former toll bridges in Australia
1956 establishments in Australia
Crossings of the Yarra River
Transport in the City of Boroondara
Transport in the City of Yarra
Buildings and structures in the City of Boroondara
Buildings and structures in the City of Yarra